DeepOcean is an Oslo, Norway - based company which provides subsea services to the global offshore industries such as Inspection Maintenance and Repair (IMR), Subsea Construction, Cable Lay, and Subsea Trenching. Its 1,100 employees project manage and operate a fleet of Vessels, ROV's and subsea Trenchers.

DeepOcean operates mostly in the Oil & Gas and Offshore Renewables industries globally, with offices located around the world.

History 

DeepOcean Group Holding (DeepOcean) was established in May 2011.

DeepOcean offers the following three main service lines: (i) Inspection, Maintenance and Repair (IMR) and subsea construction, (ii) Seabed Intervention (incl. trenching), and (iii) Cable Installation, servicing the Global Offshore Energy industry from inception to decommissioning.

DO 1 UK Ltd., formerly known as CTC Marine Projects Ltd., was established in 1993. Its initial core business was the provision of fibre optic cable lay and seabed intervention solutions for the global telecommunication market. Later, the company diversified and added cable lay and trenching services for the oil & gas, offshore renewables and interconnectors industries.

DeepOcean AS was established in 1999. It is founded on the provision of high quality equipment and subsea services combined with a team of highly experienced personnel with knowledge of deepwater operations. DeepOcean now has the track record and experience to take on deepwater assignments anywhere in the world.

Late 2016 Funds advised by Triton became the largest shareholder of DeepOcean. The Triton funds invest in and support the positive development of medium-sized businesses headquartered in Northern Europe, Italy and Spain.

In April 2022, it was announced that DeepOcean had acquired the Norwegian engineering and technology company, Installit AS and its subsidiaries.

Offices worldwide

Organisation 

DeepOcean has a Supervisory Board of Directors as well as an Executive Management Team who oversee the daily management of DeepOcean's activities.

Board of Directors:

 Jo Lunder, Chairman of the Board
 Øyvind Mikaelsen, CEO & Director
 Terje Askvig, Non-Executive Director
 Kristian Diesen, Non-Executive Director

Executive Management:

 Øyvind Mikaelsen, CEO
 Frode Garlid, CFO
 Ottar K Mæland, COO
 Stephane Abergel, CCO

References

Energy engineering and contractor companies
Engineering companies of Norway